Robin Gerster is an Australian author who was born in Melbourne and educated in Melbourne and Sydney. Formerly a Professor in the School of Languages, Literatures, Cultures and Linguistics at Monash University, Gerster has written prolifically on the cultural histories of war and travel, and on Western representations of Japan. As a postgraduate, he won the Australian War Memorial's inaugural C.E.W. Bean Scholarship, for a research project on Australian war literature. The PhD thesis that emerged from this research was subsequently published as Big-noting: The Heroic Theme in Australian War Writing, which remains the landmark study in its field. In 1988, it won The Age Book of the Year Award in the non-fiction category.

In the 1990s he held the Chair in Australian Studies at the University of Tokyo – an experience which led to the controversial travel book, Legless in Ginza: Orientating Japan (1999). His book, Travels in Atomic Sunshine: Australia and the Occupation of Japan, won the New South Wales Premier's Prize for Australian History in 2009, and was shortlisted for the Queensland Premier's Non-Fiction Book Award and the Prime Minister's Prize for Australian History. It was republished in a new paperback edition, with an Afterword, in 2019.  Published in 2020, Hiroshima and Here: Reflections on Australian Atomic Culture is a cultural history of Nuclear Age Australia, focusing on the reverberating impact of the atomic bombings of August 1945, and the complexity of Australian responses to the fact and possibility of nuclear destruction.

Major works: author 
 
 
 
 
  
  
 
 _  (2020). Hiroshima and Here: Reflections on Australian Atomic Culture. Lanham, Md: Lexington Books/Rowman and Littlefield. .

Major works: editor 
 
 
 

1953 births
Academics from Melbourne
Australian historians
Living people
Meanjin people
Monash University alumni
Academic staff of Monash University